Lamine-Gueye Koné (born 1 February 1989), known as Lamine Koné, is a professional footballer who plays as a centre-back for  club Le Mans. Born in France, he represents the Ivory Coast national team.

Club career

Early career
Koné began his career with local youth clubs in the Île-de-France region. In 2003, he joined second division club LB Châteauroux and, after three years in the club's youth academy, was promoted to the senior team for the 2005–06 season. Koné made his professional debut on 27 April 2007 in a league match against Montpellier. He spent three more years at the club amassing over 70 appearances.

Lorient
On 30 July 2010, Koné joined Lorient on a four-year contract. The transfer fee was priced at €1 million. He signed a new three-year contract on 23 July 2013. He was signed as a replacement for Laurent Koscielny who had moved to Arsenal. Koné made 139 appearances, scoring seven goals over six seasons at Lorient.

Sunderland

On 27 January 2016, Koné signed for Premier League club Sunderland for an undisclosed fee until 2020. This followed a protracted transfer saga that had previously broken down twice, and had seen Lorient threaten Sunderland with legal action for initially pulling out of a deal. On 13 February, Koné played a big part in securing a vital win for the Black Cats against Manchester United. From an 82nd-minute corner, Koné rose up for a header and as the ball headed towards the goal, David de Gea and Anthony Martial got in a tangle before the ball eventually went in off the back of the Spanish goalkeeper for an own goal. Koné followed this up with two goals against Everton on 11 May 2016 in a 3–0 victory that saved Sunderland from relegation.

After telling new manager David Moyes that he wanted to leave the club in August, Koné had a change of heart and eventually signed a new five-year contract on 14 September 2016.

Loan to Strasbourg
On 1 August 2018, Koné joined Ligue 1 side Strasbourg on a season-long loan. Strasbourg were also given the option to sign the centre-back permanently at the end of the season.

Strasbourg
On 1 June 2019, following a successful loan stint, Koné joined Strasbourg permanently from Sunderland for an undisclosed fee. In June 2021 he left Strasbourg on a free transfer due to his contract expiring.

Lausanne-Sport
On 8 November 2021, Koné signed for Lausanne-Sport on a free transfer, four months after his release from Strasbourg.

Le Mans
On 16 January 2023, Koné joined Le Mans in the third-tier Championnat National.

International career
Koné was born in France to Ivorian parents. He is a former French youth international having played at under-17, under-18, under-19, and under-20 level. Koné played with the latter team at the 2009 Mediterranean Games and the 2010 Toulon Tournament. He switched to the Ivory Coast national team and made his debut in a 4–1 loss to Cameroon in 2014.

Career statistics

Club

International

Honours
Strasbourg
Coupe de la Ligue: 2018–19

References

External links
 
 
 

1989 births
Footballers from Paris
French sportspeople of Ivorian descent
Living people
Ivorian footballers
French footballers
France youth international footballers
Ivory Coast international footballers
Association football central defenders
LB Châteauroux players
FC Lorient players
Sunderland A.F.C. players
RC Strasbourg Alsace players
FC Lausanne-Sport players
Le Mans FC players
Ligue 1 players
Ligue 2 players
Championnat National 2 players
Premier League players
English Football League players
Swiss Super League players
Competitors at the 2009 Mediterranean Games
2017 Africa Cup of Nations players
Mediterranean Games competitors for France
Ivorian expatriate footballers
Expatriate footballers in England
Ivorian expatriate sportspeople in England
Expatriate footballers in Switzerland
Ivorian expatriate sportspeople in Switzerland